Charles Dupuis may refer to:
 Charles-François Dupuis, French savant
 Charles Dupuis (engraver)

See also
 Charles Dupuy, French prime minister